Kamalakanta Santra (born 1 July 1960) is an Indian weightlifter. He competed in the men's featherweight event at the 1984 Summer Olympics.

References

1960 births
Living people
Indian male weightlifters
Olympic weightlifters of India
Weightlifters at the 1984 Summer Olympics
Place of birth missing (living people)